Dennis-Yarmouth Regional High School is a suburban public high school (grades 812) in Yarmouth, Massachusetts, United States. It opened in 1957 and was expanded and renovated in 1979, and again in 2006. The school serves the communities of Yarmouth and Dennis, and has an enrollment of approximately 900 students. Dennis-Yarmouth, or known more commonly to the locals as "D-Y", is the second largest high school (in terms of student population) on Cape Cod, behind only Barnstable High School. It is in South Yarmouth, just south of the Mid Cape Highway.

Demographics
Based on data from the Massachusetts Department of Elementary and Secondary Education:

As of 2021, Dennis-Yarmouth Regional High School had 881 students,
including 440 females, 441 males, and 0 non-binary students.
 550 (62.4%) were Caucasian
 130 (14.8%) were Hispanic
 93 (10.6%) were African-American
 48 (5.4%) were Multi-Race, Non-Hispanic
 37 (4.2%) were unknown
 24 (2.7%) were Asian
 0 (0%) were Native American
 0 (0%) were Native Hawaiian, Pacific Islander

Athletics

Football

The Dolphins' football team has developed into one of the most successful and formidable high school football programs in Massachusetts in recent years. They have appeared in three state championship games, winning two in 2011 and 2017. They have also been ranked in the state's Top 25 polls numerous times, being ranked as high as #4 by the Boston Globe and #5 by MaxPreps. Furthermore, they have produced several high-level college football prospects in recent years.

Football Accomplishments
State Champions - 2011,2017
State Finalists - 2013
Eastern Massachusetts Regional Champions - 2013, 2017
League Champions - 1960, 2007, 2010, 2011, 2017
State Playoff Qualifier - 2010, 2011, 2013, 2014, 2015, 2016

Cross Country

Dennis-Yarmouth's cross-country teams are regarded as one of the premier programs in New England and have won numerous state, regional, and national championships in recent years.

The boys team won the All-State Championship in back to back years, the only boys team in Massachusetts to have done so (the MIAA switched from a single all-state championship race for each gender in cross country to large and small school state championship races in 1990) . Further, the boys team did it twice, in 1974/1975 and 1989/1990. Harrier magazine ranked them one of the top 25 teams in the United States in 1989 and 1990.
The girls team won the Div. I (large schools) All-State team championship in 2006.  Jordan O'Dea is the only D-Y cross country runner to garner an individual All-State Championship, finishing first in the All-State Div. II (small schools) race in 2011.

Field Hockey
State Champions - 2018

Notable alumni
Amy Jo Johnson, actress
Josh Heinrich Taves, NFL football player
Highly Suspect, rock band

See also
 List of high schools in Massachusetts

References

  wbztv.com - Teen Sends A Little Bit Of Cape Cod To U.S. Troops

External links
 Dennis-Yarmouth Regional High School Home Page 
 Dennis-Yarmouth Regional High School Athletics Page
 DYMedia1 Youtube Channel

Schools in Barnstable County, Massachusetts
Public high schools in Massachusetts
Yarmouth, Massachusetts
1957 establishments in Massachusetts